Under South Korean law, the hunting and capturing of a large number of species of wild animals is prohibited.  These include 64 species of mammals, 396 species of birds, 16 species of reptiles, and 10 species of amphibians.  Most of these species are not actually endangered species, but are protected for other reasons.  No freshwater fish are included on the list, although some are endangered.

These species are defined in Appendix 6 of the Enforcement Regulation of the Protection of Wild Fauna and Flora Act, Ministry of Environment Ordinance #183, amended September 27, 2005.

Mammals

Chiroptera
Rhinolophus ferrumequinum
Eptesicus kobayashii
Eptesicus nilssoni
Eptesicus serotinus
Miniopterus fuscus
Miniopterus schreibersi
Murina aurata
Murina leucogaster
Myotis daubentoni
Myotis frater
Myotis ikonnikovi
Myotis macrodactylus
Myotis mystacinus
Myotis nattereri
Nyctalus aviator
Nyctalus noctula
Pipistrellus abramus
Pipistrellus savii
Vespertilio murinus
Vespertilio orientalis
Vespertilio superans
Tadarida teniotis

Insectivora

Erinaceus amurensis
Crocidura dsinezumi
Crocidura lasiura
Crocidura russula
Crocidura sauveolens
Neomys fodiens
Sorex araneus
Sorex caecutiens
Sorex gracillimus
Sorex minutissimus
Sorex mirabilis
Sorex unguiculatus
Mogera robusta
Mogera wogura

Lagomorpha
Lepus coreanus
Lepus manschuricus
Ochotona hyperborea

Rodentia
Petaurista leucogenys
Sciurus vulgaris
Tamias sibiricus
Apodemus agrarius
Clethrionomys rufocanus
Clethrionomys rutilus
Cricetulus barabensis
Micromys minutus
Microtus fortis
Microtus mandarinus
Ondatra zibethicus
Tscherskia triton
Sicista caudata

Carnivora
Cuon alpinus
Nyctereutes procyonoides
Ursus arctos
Martes melampus
Martes zibellina
Meles meles
Mustela sibirica

Artiodactyla
Sus scrofa
Capreolus capreolus
Cervus elaphus
Hydropotes inermis

Birds

Gaviiformes
Gavia adamsii
Gavia arctica
Gavia pacifica
Gavia stellata

Podicipediformes
Podiceps auritus
Podiceps cristatus
Podiceps grisegena
Podiceps nigricollis
Podiceps ruficollis

Procellariiformes
Diomedea albatrus
Calonectris leucoelas
Pterodroma hypoleuca
Puffinus carneipes
Puffinus tenuirostris
Oceanodroma monorhis

Pelecaniformes
Pelecanus philippensis
Sula dactylatra
Sula leucogaster
Fregata ariel
Phalacrocorax carbo
Phalacrocorax filamentosus
Urile pelagicus
Urile urile
Platalea minor

Ciconiiformes
Ardea cinerea
Ardea purpurea
Ardeola bacchus
Botaurus stellaris
Bubulcus ibis
Butorides striatus
Egretta alba alba
Egretta alba modesta
Egretta garzetta
Egretta intermedia
Egretta sacra
Ixobrychus cinnamomeus
Ixobrychus flavicollis
Ixobrychus sinensis
Nycticorax nycticorax
Nipponia nippon
Threskiornis melanocephalus

Anseriformes
Aix galericulata
Anas acuta
Anas americana
Anas carolinensis
Anas clypeata
Anas crecca
Anas falcata
Anas penelope
Anas platyrhynchos
Anas poecilorhyncha
Anas querquedula
Anas rubripes
Anas strepera
Anser albifrons
Anser anser
Anser caerulescens
Anser canagicus
Aythya americana
Aythya ferina
Aythya fuligula
Aythya marila
Aythya valisineria
Branta canadensis
Bucephala clangula
Bucephala islandica
Clangula hyemalis
Histrionicus histrionicus
Melanitta fusca
Melanitta nigra
Mergus albellus
Mergus merganser
Mergus serrator
Netta rufina
Tadorna cristata
Tadorna ferruginea
Tadorna tadorna

Falconiformes
Accipiter nisus
Accipiter soloensis
Aquila nipalensis
Butastur indicus
Gypaetus barbatus
Spilornis cheela
Spizaetus nipalensis
Falco cherrug
Falco tinnunculus

Galliformes
Coturnix japonica
Phasianus colchicus
Tetrastes bonasia
Tetrao tetrix
Turnix tanki

Gruiformes
Grus canadensis
Grus virgo
Amaurornis phoenicurus
Fulica atra
Gallinula chloropus
Porzana exquisita
Porzana fusca
Porzana paykullii
Porzana pusilla
Rallus aquaticus

Charadriiformes
Hydrophasianus chirurgus
Charadrius alexandrinus
Charadrius dubius
Charadrius leschenaultii
Charadrius mongolus
Charadrius veredus
Microsarcops cinereus
Pluvialis fulva
Pluvialis squatarola
Vanellus vanellus
Arenaria interpres
Calidris acuminata
Calidris alpina
Calidris canutus
Calidris ferruginea
Calidris melanotos
Calidris minuta
Calidris minutilla
Calidris ruficollis
Calidris temminckii
Calidris tenuirostris
Crocethia alba
Gallinago gallinago
Gallinago hardwickii
Gallinago megala
Gallinago solitaria
Gallinago stenura
Limicola falcinellus
Limnodromus scolopaceus
Limnodromus semipalmatus
Limosa lapponica
Limosa limosa
Lymnocryptes minimus
Numenius arquata
Numenius minutus
Numenius phaeopus
Philomachus pugnax
Scolopax rusticola
Tringa brevipes
Tringa erythropus
Tringa glareola
Tringa hypoleucos
Tringa melanoleuca
Tringa nebularia
Tringa ochropus
Tringa stagnatilis
Tringa totanus
Tryngites subruficollis
Xenus cinereus
Himantopus himantopus
Recurvirostra avocetta
Phalaropus fulicarius
Phalaropus lobatus
Phalaropus tricolor
Rostratula benghalensis
Glareola maldivarum
Larus argentatus
Larus cachinans
Larus canus
Larus crassirostris
Larus genei
Larus glaucescens
Larus glaucoides
Larus heuglini
Larus hyperboreus
Larus ridibundus
Larus sabini
Larus schistisagus
Larus tridactyla
Pagophila eburnea
Rhodostethia rosea
Sterna albifrons
Sterna caspia
Sterna fuscata
Sterna hirundo
Sterna leucoptera
Sterna nigra
Thalasseus bergii
Stercorarius parasiticus
Aethia pusilla
Brachyramphus marmoratus
Cepphus carbo
Cerorhinca monocerata
Synthliboramphus antiquus
Uria aalge

Columbiformes
Columba janthina
Columba oenas
Columba rupestris
Streptopelia decaocto
Streptopelia orientalis
Streptopelia tranquebarica
Treron sieboldii
Syrrhaptes paradoxus

Cuculiformes
Clamator coromandus
Cuculus canorus
Cuculus fugax
Cuculus micropterus
Cuculus poliocephalus
Cuculus saturatus

Strigiformes
Asio flammeus
Asio otus
Athene noctua
Ninox scutulata
Nyctea scandiaca
Otus bakkamoena
Otus scops
Surnia ulula

Caprimulgiformes
Caprimulgus indicus

Apodiformes

Apus affinus
Apus pacificus
Chaetura caudacuta

Coraciiformes
Alcedo atthis
Ceryle lugubris
Halcyon coromanda
Halcyon pileata
Eurystomus orientalis
Upupa epops

Piciformes
Dendrocopos canicapillus
Dendrocopos kizuki
Dendrocopos leucotos
Dendrocopos hyperethrys
Dendrocopos major
Dendrocopos minor
Jynx torquilla
Picoides tridactylus
Picus canus

Passeriformes

Delichon urbica
Hirundo daurica
Hirundo rustica
Riparia riparia
Alauda arvensis
Calandrella brachydactyla
Calandrella rufescens
Anthus cervinus
Anthus gustavi
Anthus roseatus
Anthus spinoletta
Anthus godlewskii
Anthus hodgsoni
Anthus novaeseelandiae
Dendronanthus indicus
Motacilla alba leucopsis
Motacilla alba lugens
Motacilla alba ocularis
Motacilla cinerea
Motacilla citreola
Motacilla flava
Motacilla grandis
Hypsipetes amaurotis
Lanius bucephalus
Lanius cristatus
Lanius excubitor
Lanius schach
Lanius sphenocercus
Lanius tigrinus
Coracina melaschistos
Pericrocotus divaricatus
Bombycilla garrulus
Bombycilla japonica
Cinclus pallasii
Troglodytes troglodytes
Prunella collaris
Prunella montanella
Acrocephalus aedon
Acrocephalus arundinaceus
Acrocephalus bistrigiceps
Cettia diphone
Cettia squameiceps
Cisticola juncidis
Cyanoptila cyanomelana
Erithacus akahige
Erithacus calliope
Erithacus cyane
Erithacus sibilans
Erithacus svecicus
Eumyias thalassina
Ficedula mugimaki
Ficedula narcissina
Ficedula parva
Ficedula zanthopygia
Helopsaltes certhiola
Helopsaltes fasciolatus
Helopsaltes ochotensis
Helopsaltes pleskei
Locustella lanceolata
Megalurus pryeri
Monticola gularis
Monticola solitarius
Muscicapa griseisticta
Muscicapa latirostris
Muscicapa sibirica
Oenanthe hispanica
Oenanthe pleschanka
Phoenicurus auroreus
Phoenicurus ochruros
Phylloscopus borealis
Phylloscopus fuscatus
Phylloscopus inornatus
Phylloscopus occipitalis
Phylloscopus proregulus
Phylloscopus schwarzi
Phylloscopus tenellipes
Phylloscopus trochiloides
Regulus regulus
Rhopophilus pekinensis
Saxicola ferrea
Saxico lamaurus
Sylvia curruca
Tarsiger cyanurus
Turdus cardis
Turdus chrysolaus
Turdus dauma
Turdus hortulorum
Turdus merula
Turdus naumanni eunomus
Turdus naumanni naumanni
Turdus pallidus
Turdus ruficollis
Turdus sibiricus
Panurus biarmicus
Paradoxornis webbiana
Tersiphone paradisi
Parus ater
Parus major
Parus montanus
Parus palustris
Parus varius
Aegithalos caudatus
Remiz pendulinus
Sitta europaea
Sitta villosa
Certhia familiaris
Zosterops erythropleura
Zosterops japonica
Calcarius lapponicus
Emberiza aureola
Emberiza bruniceps
Emberiza chrysophrys
Emberiza cioides
Emberiza elegans
Emberiza fucata
Emberiza jankowskii
Emberiza leucocephala
Emberiza pusilla
Emberiza rustica
Emberiza rutila
Emberiza schoeniclus
Emberiza spodocephala
Emberiza sulphurata
Emberiza tristrami
Emberiza variabilis
Emberiza yessoensis
Plectrophenax nivalis
Carduelis flammea
Carduelis hornemanni
Carduelis sinica
Carduelis spinus
Carpodacus erythrinus
Carpodacus roseus
Coccothraustes coccothraustes
Eophona migratoria
Eophona personata
Fringilla montifringilla
Leucosticte arctoa
Loxia curvirostra
Loxia leucoptera
Pinicola enucleator
Pyrrhula pyrrhula
Uragus sibiricus
Sturnus cineraceus
Sturnus philippensis
Sturnus sinensis
Sturnus sturninus
Sturnus vulgaris
Passer montanus
Passer rutilans
Oriolus chinensis
Dicrurus hottentottus
Dicrurus leucophaeus
Dicrurus macrocercus
Artamus leucorhynchus
Corvus corone
Corvus frugilegus
Corvus macrorhynchos
Corvus monedula
Cyanopica cyana
Garrulus glandarius
Nucifraga caryocatactes
Pica pica
Pyrrhocorax pyrrhocorax

Reptiles

Testudines

Dermochelys coriacea schlegelii
Chelonia mydas japonica
Pelodiscus sinensis
Scinella laterale laterale
Takydromus wolteri

Squamata

Elaphe dione
Elaphe rufodorsata
Rhabdophis tigrinus tigrinus
Zamenis spinalis Peters
Dinodon rufozonatus rufozonatus
Amphiesma vibakari ruthveni
Gloydius ussuriensis
Gloydius brevicauda
Agkistrodon saxatilis
Hydrophis melanocephalus
Pelamis platurus

Amphibians

Caudata

Hynobius leechii
Hynobius quelpaertensis
Hynobius yangi
Onychodactylus fischeri

Anura

Bufo gargarizans
Bufo stejnegeri
Hyla suweonensis
Rana amurensis
Rana dybowskii
Rana huanrenensis

See also
Natural monuments of South Korea

Lists of biota of South Korea
 Protected, South Korea
Law of South Korea